24 Days may refer to:

Film and television 

 24 Days, a 2014 French film directed by Alexandre Arcady
 24 Days (2019 film), an Indian Malayalam-language road movie